Podkolzin is a Russian surname. Notable people with the surname include:

Pavel Podkolzin (born 1985), Russian basketball player
Vasily Podkolzin (born 2001), Russian ice hockey player

Russian-language surnames